This  nasolabial cyst, also known as a nasoalveolar cyst, is located superficially in the soft tissues of the upper lip.  Unlike most of the other developmental cysts, the nasolabial cyst is an example of an extraosseous cyst, one that occurs outside of bone.  It will therefore not show up on a radiograph, or an X-ray film.

References

External links 

Cysts of the oral and maxillofacial region